Smile Please: An Unfinished Autobiography is a posthumously published, unfinished autobiographical work written by Dominican author Jean Rhys. It was first published in 1979 by Andre Deutsch Ltd (London) and Harper & Rowe (New York City). The book was edited by and contained an introduction by Rhys's editor, Diana Athill.

The first part of the book consists of the account of her childhood in Dominica. The second part of the book consists of drafts about her adult life, ending in 1923. A photographic section divides the two parts.

References

Further reading 

 Angier, Carol, Jean Rhys. Life and Work, Little, Brown and Co., 1990
 Pizzichini, Lilian The Blue Hour: A Life of Jean Rhys, W. W. Norton & Company, 2009

External links 

 Floriane Reviron-Piégay, Jean Rhys’s Smile Please: Re/De constructing identity through autobiography and photography OpenEdition 

unfinished books
Books by Jean Rhys
1979 non-fiction books
Autobiographies
André Deutsch books